Michael O. Wilder is a former member of the Wisconsin State Assembly.

Biography
Wilder was born on November 10, 1941, in Park Falls, Wisconsin. He is married with two children.

Career
Wilder was first elected to the Assembly in 1992. Previously, he was a Chippewa County, Wisconsin supervisor from 1972 to 1975. He is a Democrat.

References

People from Park Falls, Wisconsin
People from Chippewa County, Wisconsin
1941 births
Living people
Democratic Party members of the Wisconsin State Assembly